Massachusetts House of Representatives' 11th Worcester district in the United States is one of 160 legislative districts included in the lower house of the Massachusetts General Court. It covers part of Worcester County. Republican Hannah Kane of Shrewsbury has represented the district since 2015.

Locales represented
The district includes the following localities:
 Shrewsbury
 part of Westborough

The current district geographic boundary overlaps with those of the Massachusetts Senate's Middlesex and Worcester district and 2nd Worcester district.

Former locale
The district previously covered part of the city of Worcester, circa 1872.

Representatives
 Samuel E. Blair, circa 1858 
 Nelson Carpenter, circa 1859 
 James Lally Jr., circa 1888 
 Thomas McCooey, circa 1888 
 John Carpenter Hull, circa 1920 
 Alfred H. Whitney, circa 1920 
 William Paul Constantino, circa 1951 
 Albert Fairbanks Higgins, circa 1951 
 Bessie I. Murray, 1957-58
 Leo R. Corazzini, circa 1975 
 Ronald W. Gauch, 1993-2001 
 Karyn Polito
 Matthew Beaton
 Hannah Kane, 2015-current

Elections results from statewide races

See also
 List of Massachusetts House of Representatives elections
 Other Worcester County districts of the Massachusetts House of Representatives: 1st, 2nd, 3rd, 4th, 5th, 6th, 7th, 8th, 9th, 10th, 12th, 13th, 14th, 15th, 16th, 17th, 18th
 Worcester County districts of the Massachusett Senate: 1st, 2nd; Hampshire, Franklin and Worcester; Middlesex and Worcester; Worcester, Hampden, Hampshire and Middlesex; Worcester and Middlesex; Worcester and Norfolk
 List of Massachusetts General Courts
 List of former districts of the Massachusetts House of Representatives

Images
Portraits of legislators

References

External links
 Ballotpedia
  (State House district information based on U.S. Census Bureau's American Community Survey).
 League of Women Voters Grafton & Shrewsbury

House
Government in Worcester County, Massachusetts